This is a bibliography of Hildegard of Bingen's works.

Original Latin works
Carlevaris, Angela, ed. Liber vite meritorum (Hildegardis Bingensis). CCCM 90. Turnhout, Belgium: Brepols, 1995.
Derolez, Albert, ed. Guibert of Gembloux, Epistolae. CCCM 66-66a. Turnhout, Belgium: Brepols, 1988, 1989.
— and Peter Dronke, eds. Liber divinorum operum (Hildegardis Bingensis). CCCM 92. Turnhout, Belgium: Brepols, 1996.
Führkötter, Adelgundis and Angela Carlevaris, eds. Scivias (Hildegardis Bingensis). CCCM 43, 43A. Turnhout, Belgium: Brepols, 2003.
Kaiser, Paul, ed. Causae et curae. Leipzig: Teubner, 1903.
Klaes, Monika, ed. Gottfried of Disibodenberg and Theoderich of Echternach, Vita sanctae Hildegardis (Hildegardis Bingensis). CCCM 126. Turnhout, Belgium: Brepols, 1993.
Migne, Jacques Paul, ed. Sanctae Hildegardis Abbatissae Opera Omnia in Patrologia Latina. Volume 197, cols. 383-738. Paris: Migne, 1855.
Pitra, Jean-Baptiste, ed. Analecta Sanctae Hildegardis Opera. Analecta Sacra, vol. 8. Monte Cassino: Typis Sacri Montis Casinensis, 1882.
Van Acker, Lieven, ed. Epistolarium I (I-XC) (Hildegardis Bingensis). CCCM 91. Turnhout, Belgium: Brepols, 1991.
—, ed. Epistolarium II (XCI-CCLr.) (Hildegardis Bingensis). CCCM 91A. Turnhout, Belgium: Brepols, 1993.

English translations

Baird, Joseph L. (trans.), Radd K. Ehrman. The letters of Hildegard of Bingen. New York : Oxford University Press, 3 vols.,1994-2004. 
Baird, Joseph L, "The Personal Correspondence of Hildegard of Bingen. New York: Oxford University Press, 2006.  
—, trans. The Letters of Hildegard of Bingen. Vol. II. Oxford: Oxford University Press, 1998.
—, trans. The Letters of Hildegard of Bingen. Vol. III. Oxford: Oxford University Press, 2004.
Bowie, Fiona and Oliver Davies, eds. Hildegard of Bingen: An Anthology. London: SPCK, 1990.
Butcher, Carmen Acevedo. Hildegard of Bingen: A Spiritual Reader. Brewster, MA: Paraclete Press, 2007.
—. Incandescence: 365 Readings with Women Mystics. Brewster, MA: Paraclete Press, 2005.
Dronke, Peter, ed. and trans. Ordo virtutum, The Play of the Virtues. In Nine Medieval Latin Plays. Cambridge: Cambridge University Press, 1994. 147-84.
Feiss, Hugh, trans. Explanation of the Rule of St. Benedict by Hildegard of Bingen. Peregrina Translation Series. 1990. Toronto: Peregrina, 1996.
—, trans. The Life of Hildegard of Bingen by Gottfried of Disibodenberg and Theodoric of Echternach. Peregrina Translation Series. Toronto: Peregrina, 1996.
Flanagan, Sabina, trans. Secrets of God: Writings of Hildegard of Bingen. Boston: Shambhala Publications, Inc., 1996.
Fox, Matthew, ed. Book of Divine Works, with Letters and Songs. Trans. Robert Cunningham, et al. Santa Fe: Bear & Co., 1987.
Führkötter, Adelgundis, and James McGrath. The Life of Holy Hildegard by the Monks Gottfried and Theodoric. Collegeville, MN: The Liturgical Press, 1980.
Hart, Columba and Jane Bishop, trans. Scivias. Classics of Western Spirituality. New York: Paulist Press, 1990. 
Hozeski, Bruce W., trans. The Book of the Rewards of Life (Liber vitae meritorum). New York: Oxford University Press, 1997. 
McInerney, Maud Burnett, ed. Hildegard of Bingen: A Book of Essays. New York: Garland Pub., 1998. 
Newman, Barbara, ed. and trans. Hildegard of Bingen: Symphonia: A Critical Edition of the Symphonia Armonie Celestium Revelationum. Ithaca, NY: Cornell University Press, 1998.
Throop, Priscilla, trans., Book of Divine Works of Hildegard of Bingen, Charlotte, VT: MedievalMS, 2009.
—, trans., Causes and Cures of Hildegard of Bingen, Charlotte, VT: MedievalMS, 2006, 2008.
—, trans., Hildegard von Bingen's PHYSICA, Rochester, VT: Inner Traditions, 1998 ; Japanese translation published by Zou Co., Ltd., 2002.
—, trans., Three Lives and a Rule: the Lives of Hildegard, Disibod, Rupert, with Hildegard’s Explanation of the Rule of St. Benedict, Charlotte, VT: MedievalMS, 2010.

Bibliographies by writer
Bibliographies of German writers
Christian bibliographies
Bibliography